Charles André Gaudin (born 30 November 1874) was a French rower who competed in the late 19th century and early 20th century. He participated in rowing at the 1900 Summer Olympics in Paris and won the silver medal in the single sculls. Herman Barrelet won gold.

The rowing events were held on the river Seine with controversy erupting during the single scull semi-finals.  Saint-George Ashe of Great Britain rowed far enough out of his lane to interfere with Raymond Benoit during the heats. Despite this, Ashe was able to keep his victory in them. He failed to qualify in the semi-final; Ashe then contended he should still be allowed to continue on to the finals.

Both Gaudin and Barrelet objected to this and refused to participate further if Ashe was allowed to advance to the finals. Both men were able to be convinced to race against Ashe. Barrelet and Gaudin easily beat Ashe; Barrelet won the gold medal and Gaudin the silver, while Ashe placed third to receive a bronze medal.

References

Sources

External links

1874 births
Year of death missing
French male rowers
Olympic silver medalists for France
Olympic rowers of France
Rowers at the 1900 Summer Olympics
Place of birth missing
Olympic medalists in rowing
Medalists at the 1900 Summer Olympics
Place of death missing